Aline dos Santos Rocha is a Brazilian wheelchair racer and skier, who came third at the 2021 Berlin Marathon, and won multiple medals at the 2023 World Para Nordic Skiing Championships. She competed at the 2016 Summer Paralympics and the 2018 and 2022 Winter Paralympics.

Personal life
Rocha is from Paraná, Brazil. At the age of 15, Rocha was injured in a car accident, and became paraplegic. She studied physical education at the University of Western Santa Catarina. Rocha is married to Fernando Orso, who is also her coach.

Wheelchair racing career
As of 2017, Rocha had won the Saint Silvester Road Race on four occasions. Later in the year, she finished third at the Oita International Wheelchair Marathon in a Brazilian national record time of 01:49:37. She competed at the 2016 Summer Paralympics, finishing ninth overall in the 1500 metres T54 competition and 10th in the marathon T54 event, after falling away from the main group after  of the race. She went out in the heats of the 5000 metres T54 event. Rocha came 10th at the 2019 London Marathon.

Rocha came third at the 2021 Berlin Marathon. Later in the year, she came fifth at the 2021 London Marathon. She suffered a flat tyre a few minutes prior to the race start.

Skiing career
In 2017, Rocha competed at the Cross-Country Ski World Cup in Ukraine.
Rocha was selected for the 2018 Winter Paralympics in Pyeongchang, South Korea. She was the first Brazilian woman to compete at a Winter Paralympic Games, and was the country's flagbearer at the Parade of Nations. At the Games, she finished 12th in the 5 km sitting event, 15th in the 12 km sitting event and 22nd in the qualification round of the 1.5 km sprint classical sitting event. She was also part of the Brazilian team that finished 13th and last in the 4 x 2.5 kilometre mixed relay; she competed in two legs of the event.

Rocha finished third in the 5 km event at the 2021 Paralympic Ski World Cup event in Kranjska Gora, Slovenia. In October 2021, she competed at the Paralympic Rollerski Championship. In January 2022, Rocha came fourth in the 15 km sitting event at the 2021 World Para Snow Sports Championships.

Rocha qualified for the 2022 Winter Paralympics in Beijing, China. Rocha and Cristian Ribera were Brazil's flag bearers at the 2022 Winter Paralympics Parade of Nations. She came seventh in the 15 km sitting event, and 10th in the 7.5 km sitting event. She was fifth in her semi-final at the 1.5 km sprint sitting event, and did not qualify for the final.

At the 2023 World Para Nordic Skiing Championships, Rocha won the sprint freestyle race, and finished third in both the 10km freestyle and 18 km classical events.

References

Living people
Athletes (track and field) at the 2016 Summer Paralympics
Female wheelchair racers
Sportspeople from Paraná (state)
Paralympic wheelchair racers
Brazilian female cross-country skiers
Cross-country skiers at the 2018 Winter Paralympics
Year of birth missing (living people)
Brazilian wheelchair racers